Billy's Love Making is a 1915 American silent romantic drama directed by and starring William Garwood and Violet Mersereau.

External links

1915 romantic drama films
1915 films
American silent short films
American black-and-white films
American romantic drama films
1915 short films
1910s American films
Silent romantic drama films
Silent American drama films